Amer Haroon (born 27 August 1992) is a Saudi professional footballer who currently plays for Al-Arabi as a defender .

Honours
Al-Wehda
Prince Mohammad bin Salman League: 2017–18

References

External links 
 

Living people
1992 births
Saudi Arabian footballers
Al-Shabab FC (Riyadh) players
Al-Wehda Club (Mecca) players
Al-Ain FC (Saudi Arabia) players
Al-Arabi SC (Saudi Arabia) players
Place of birth missing (living people)
Saudi First Division League players
Saudi Professional League players
Association football defenders